800 Tower City Club Apartments, formerly The 800 Apartments, is a 29-story skyscraper in Louisville, Kentucky built in 1963. The building is named after its address of 800 South Fourth Street.

History
It was constructed in 1963.

On June 16, 2015, Michigan-based property management firm, Village Green announced the purchase of the 800 Building, and renamed it 800 Tower City Apartments, and began renovations expected to exceed $10 million, and take 18 months.

Architectural features
The building features an underground parking garage and four 29th floor penthouses along with an outdoor area on the roof. All rental units, except those on the 2nd floor, have outdoor balconies. The ground floor has in various years featured a restaurant from time to time, and in 2017, Bar Vetti, a new Italian restaurant with indoor and outdoor patio seating opened.

References

External links
 
 Tour the 800 Tower City Club, Photo Gallery — Courier Journal, October 4, 2018
 New management to take over 800 Tower City Apartments — Insider Louisville News, January 30, 2017
 Downtown Louisville's 800 Building gets new name as renovations ramp up — Louisville Business First, July 24, 2015

Residential buildings completed in 1963
Skyscrapers in Louisville, Kentucky
Apartment buildings in Louisville, Kentucky
Residential skyscrapers in Kentucky
1963 establishments in Kentucky